Coleman Glacier is a steep, heavily crevassed glacier draining westward from Mount Andrus in the south part of the Ames Range, Marie Byrd Land. It was mapped by the United States Geological Survey from surveys and from U.S. Navy air photos, 1959–65, and named by the Advisory Committee on Antarctic Names for Master Sergeant Coleman A. Hanes, United States Army, a member of the Army–Navy Trail Party that traversed eastward to establish Byrd Station in 1956.

References

Glaciers of Marie Byrd Land
Ames Range